Radamaea is a genus of flowering plants belonging to the family Orobanchaceae.

Its native range is Madagascar.

Species:

Radamaea latifolia 
Radamaea montana 
Radamaea perrieri 
Radamaea rupestris

References

Orobanchaceae
Orobanchaceae genera